William de Lacy Aherne (17 April 1867 – 4 December 1945) was an English architect, notable for designing many Arts and Crafts houses in the Moseley area of Birmingham.

Family
Born in Cheam, Surrey to William Aherne (b. 1841) and Emma Paterson (b. 1842), de Lacy Aherne came from a family of devout Plymouth Brethren, a faith that he ceased to share in early adulthood. 

He married Annie Louise Thomas (1872 – 1942), daughter of William Thomas (1841 - 1901) and Mary Louise Wright (1847 - 1912) in 1898 and they had two sons- the actors Pat Aherne and *Brian Aherne- and a daughter. When he died on 4 December 1945 he was living at 25 Ladbrooke Road, London.

Career
In 1886 or 1887 he took a job as an architect's apprentice in Birmingham, where he worked for the King's Norton and Northfield Sanitary Authority. His earliest recorded private commissions were in the King's Norton area and date from 1889, and in 1890 he was elected to the Birmingham Architectural Association.

In 1898 de Lacy Aherne was commissioned to build a series of houses by his father-in-law, whose local contacts in the Moseley area were helpful to the rising young architect; his work quickly became fashionable among the rapidly growing and wealthy professional middle class of the area. From 1903 onwards he designed a large number of speculative houses in high-status Moseley roads such as Russell Road, Salisbury Road, Amesbury Road, Reddings Road and Oxford Road, financed either by himself or in conjunction with local building firms. Several of these houses, including 9 St Agnes Road and 110 and 112 Oxford Road are now listed buildings. He was probably also the architect of Blackhill, the home of Birmingham Repertory Theatre founder Barry Jackson in the Malvern Hills.

Selected works
Ford House, Castle Road, Kenilworth 1896
Court Hey, 25 Chantry Road, Moseley, Birmingham ca. 1901
House, 9 St Agnes Road, Moseley, Birmingham 1906-07
Two houses, 110 and 112 Oxford Road, Moseley, Birmingham 1906-07
Two houses, 37-39 Poplar Avenue, Bearwood, Birmingham 1908
House, 40 Reddings Road, Moseley, Birmingham 1908
The Grey House, 28 Amesbury Road, Moseley, Birmingham 1908
Three houses, 30-34 Amesbury Road, Moseley, Birmingham 1908
Five houses, 42-50 Reddings Road, Moseley, Birmingham 1908
House, 40 Sommerville Road, Sutton Coldfield 1910
Three houses, 189-193 Russell Road, Moseley, Birmingham 1911
Three houses, 42-46 Wake Green Road, Moseley Birmingham 1911
House, 54 Sommerville Road, Sutton Coldfield 1911
Inverblair, 52 Sommerville Road, Sutton Coldfield 1911
Richmond, 50 Sommerville Road, Sutton Coldfield 1911
Siviter House, 17 Ludgate Hill, Birmingham 1912
Five houses, 78-86 Eastern Road, Wylde Green, Birmingham 1914
House, 187 Russel Road, Moseley, Birmingham 1914
House, 179 Russell Road, Moseley, Birmingham 1915
House, 55 Russell Road, Moseley, Birmingham 1915

References

Bibliography

Architects from Birmingham, West Midlands
People from Cheam
1867 births
1945 deaths